The men's coxed pair competition at the 1976 Summer Olympics took place at Notre Dame Island Olympic Basin, Canada. It was held from 18 to 25 July. There were 13 boats (40 competitors, with West Germany making one substitution) from 13 nations, with each nation limited to a single boat in the event. The event was won by Harald Jährling, Friedrich-Wilhelm Ulrich, and Georg Spohr of East Germany, the nation's second consecutive victory in the event (with an entirely different crew than in 1972). The Soviet Union (Dmitry Bekhterev, Yuriy Shurkalov, and cox Yuriy Lorentsson) earned that nation's first medal in the event since 1960 with their silver. The Czechoslovakian brothers Oldřich Svojanovský and Pavel Svojanovský became the 8th and 9th men to win multiple medals in the event, adding a bronze to 1972 silver with new cox Ludvík Vébr.

Background

This was the 14th appearance of the event. Rowing had been on the programme in 1896 but was cancelled due to bad weather. The men's coxed pair was one of the original four events in 1900, but was not held in 1904, 1908, or 1912. It returned to the programme after World War I and was held every Games from 1924 to 1992, when it (along with the men's coxed four) was replaced with the men's lightweight double sculls and men's lightweight coxless four.

Three of the 18 competitors from the 1972 coxed pair Final A returned: Oldřich Svojanovský and Pavel Svojanovský, the rowers from the silver-medal Czechoslovakia boat, and Yuriy Lorentsson, the coxswain of the fifth-place Soviet Union crew. East Germany had won the 1972 Olympics and 1975 World Championship, but sent a different crew after Harald Jährling, Friedrich-Wilhelm Ulrich, and Georg Spohr defeated the reigning champions in Grünau in May. Similarly, the Soviet Union had won the 1974 World Championship, but sent a different crew. Primo Baran, a member of the 1968 Italian gold medalist team, returned after not being selected for the coxed pair in 1972.

No nations made their debut in the event. France and the United States each made their 12th appearance, tied for most among nations to that point.

Competition format

The coxed pair event featured three-person boats, with two rowers and a coxswain. It was a sweep rowing event, with the rowers each having one oar (and thus each rowing on one side). The course used the 2000 metres distance that became the Olympic standard in 1912. The competition consisted of three main rounds (quarterfinals, semifinals, and finals) as well as a repechage after the quarterfinals.

 The 13 boats were divided into three heats for the quarterfinals, with 4 or 5 boats in each heat. The top 3 boats in each heat advanced directly to the semifinals (9 boats total). The remaining 4 boats competed in a single-heat repechage.
 The top 3 boats in the repechage advanced to the semifinals; the last-place boat was eliminated.
 The semifinals consisted of two heats of 6 boats each. The top 3 boats in each semifinal advanced to the "A" final (1st through 6th place). The 4th through 6th place boats were placed in the "B" final (7th through 12th place).

Schedule

All times are Eastern Daylight Time (UTC-4)

Results

Quarterfinals

Quarterfinal 1

Quarterfinal 2

Quarterfinal 3

Repechage

Semifinals

Semifinal 1

Semifinal 2

Finals

Final B

Final A

Final classification

References

Rowing at the 1976 Summer Olympics
Men's events at the 1976 Summer Olympics